Tjodalv (born Ian Kenneth Åkesson in 1976) is a Norwegian drummer. He is a founding member of both Dimmu Borgir and Old Man's Child. He now plays in Black Comedy and Susperia. Tjodalv played guitar on the first Dimmu Borgir albums Inn i evighetens mørke and For all tid. He then switched to drumming for them on Stormblåst and continued with this until 1999. Due to his family and musical differences he left Dimmu Borgir on amicable terms. He was replaced by Nicholas Barker, former drummer of Cradle of Filth.

Shortly before leaving Dimmu Borgir, he founded the group Susperia, with whom he remains active to date.

Discography 
With Dimmu Borgir
Inn i evighetens mørke (1994)
For all tid (1995)
Stormblåst (1996)
Enthrone Darkness Triumphant (1997)
Godless Savage Garden (1998)
Spiritual Black Dimensions (1999)

With Gromth
 The Immortal (2011)
 Alone (Single, 2012)

With Susperia
 Illusions of Evil (Demo, 2000)
 Predominance (2001)
Vindication (2002)
Unlimited (2004)
 Devil May Care (EP, 2005)
 Cut from Stone (2007)
 Attitude  (2009)
 Nothing Remains (Single, 2011)

References 

Dimmu Borgir members
Living people
Norwegian black metal musicians
Norwegian heavy metal drummers
Male drummers
Norwegian rock keyboardists
Norwegian rock guitarists
Norwegian heavy metal guitarists
Norwegian multi-instrumentalists
Place of birth missing (living people)
1976 births
21st-century Norwegian drummers
Susperia members
Old Man's Child members